Fractured is the second and final full-length album by American technical death metal band Capharnaum.

Track listing

All lyrics are written by Matt Heafy, except where noted.
Ingrained - 3:50
Fractured - 3:52
Perpetuate Catatonia - 2:54
Machines - 1:59 (Lyrics: Jason Suecof)
Icon of Malice - 4:19 (Lyrics: Tony Espinoza)
Reins of Humanity - 3:30
The Scourge Trial - 2:27
Refusal - 6:45

Personnel
 Matt Heafy - lead vocal (except Track 4 & 5)
 Jason Suecof - guitar, mixing, mastering, lead vocal (Track 4 & 5 only)
 Daniel Mongrain - guitar
 Mike Poggione - bass
 Jordan Suecof - drums

External links

2004 albums
Capharnaum (band) albums
Willowtip Records albums
Albums produced by Jason Suecof